Bai pong moan (lit. ''rice and chicken eggs'') is a Cambodian dish, consisting of fried eggs and white rice. Beaten eggs are preferred and herbs are often added for flavor. Unbeaten eggs are usually cooked until crisp on one side and somewhat raw on the other side. Salt, soy sauce, or fish sauce, can be used to flavor the eggs, and soy sauce can also be applied to the rice. Due to the wide availability of eggs and rice in Cambodia, bai pong moan is a very common dish, filling rather than gourmet. It is a cheap and satiating dish which is simple to prepare, similar to chicken soup or macaroni and cheese.

Bai pong moan can be served with congee.

Variations
Bai pong moan kralok - Beaten eggs with a choice of varieties of herbs, served with rice but usually without soy sauce
Bai pong moan mul - Unbeaten eggs cooked until crisp, yolk kept raw. This variation is eaten mainly with soy sauce and rice.
Pong moan bampong - Deep-fried eggs eaten as a snack, generally without rice.

See also

Cambodian cuisine
 List of rice dishes
Omelette

References

External links
Siri's corner - Saturday, October 13, 2007. Bi Pong Moun pictures 

Cambodian cuisine
Egg dishes
Rice dishes